Mubeen Hameed (born 13 December 1995) is a Pakistani cricketer. He made his first-class debut for Lahore Blues in the 2017–18 Quaid-e-Azam Trophy on 15 October 2017.

References

External links
 

1995 births
Living people
Pakistani cricketers
Place of birth missing (living people)
Lahore Blues cricketers